Hell of a Book is a 2021 book by Jason Mott. It won the 2021 National Book Award for Fiction.

Plot summary 
In alternating chapters, the novel tells the stories of two different characters: a nameless novelist on tour for a book also titled Hell of a Book, and an African-American child named Soot. Soot, who lives near Whiteville, North Carolina, is being bullied on the school bus, while the novelist is troubled by visions of a child he calls "The Kid", who speaks to him in riddles.

Reception 
The Star-News said that with the novel, Mott earned "a place on the shelf beside such African-American writers as Colson Whitehead and Octavia Butler".

On November 17, 2021, the novel was awarded the 2021 National Book Award for Fiction. It was also longlisted for the 2022 Andrew Carnegie Medal for Excellence in Fiction, the 2022 Aspen Words Literary Prize, and the 2022 Joyce Carol Oates Prize.

Notes

References 

2021 American novels
Novels by Jason Mott
E. P. Dutton books
Novels set in North Carolina
Novels about racism
National Book Award for Fiction winning works